Luano District is a district of Central Province, Zambia. It was separated from Mkushi District in 2012.

References 

Districts of Central Province, Zambia